The Tomb of Li Dan (Chinese: 李诞墓, Lĭ Dàn mù), is a Northern Zhou period (557-581 CE) funeral monument to a foreigner named "Lĭ Dàn" (李诞) in the Chinese epitaph. The tomb was excavated in the east of the ancient city of Xi'an, capital of the Western Wei (534-557 CE) and Northern Zhou (557-581 CE) dynasties, in the same area where the tombs of Kangye, Anjia and Shijun were discovered. The tomb with its epitaph are now located in the collections of the Xi'an City Museum. Lĭ Dàn died in 564 CE.

Epitaph
According to the epitaph, Lĭ Dàn was a "Brahmin" (Chinese: 婆罗门 Póluómén). He descended from an honourable family, and his grandfather had once been a tribal leader. Between 520 and 525 CE, he and his family migrated from Jibin (area of Gandhara in northwestern India) to China, and received the favours of Emperor Taizu (507–556 CE). Lĭ Dàn died at the age of 59 in his home in Xi'an, in 564 CE. He received posthumously the title of "Prefect of the Hán Prefecture" ("邯州刺史") from the Emperor. His son Panti (槃提) wrote the epitaph.

The epitaph reads:

Tomb
The tomb was a single arc-square brick chambered tomb, with a long sloping passage and tunnel, reflective of traditional Chinese tombs of the Northern Zhou period. Enclosed by a brick wall, it had a stone gateway, behind which the stone coffin was placed. The coffin contained two skeletons, of a man and a woman, wrapped in three layers of textiles, accompanied by a Byzantine gold coin Justinian I, (527-565 CE) inside the mouth of the woman. Traces of pigments suggest that the inside walls of the tomb were originally painted.

The coffin is decorated with fine incised carvings representing traditional Chinese cosmology. The motifs also included two haloed guards in non-Chinese style, and a fire altar, which could be Zoroastrian.

Similar coffins

See also
 Sogdian tombs in China

References

Buildings and structures completed in the 6th century
Archaeological discoveries in China
Northern Zhou
Tombs in China